Curie is a large lunar impact crater, much of which lies on the far side of the Moon as seen from the Earth. The western rim projects into the near side of the Moon, as defined by the selenographic coordinate system. However the visibility of this formation depends on the effects of libration, so that it can be brought fully into view or completely hidden depending on the orientation of the Moon. When visible, however, it is seen nearly from the side, limiting the amount of detail that can be observed.

Nearby craters of note include Schorr to the northwest and the walled plain Sklodowska to the northeast. Attached to the southeastern rim is the heavily damaged walled plain Lauritsen. Both Sklodowska and Lauritsen are smaller than Curie.

The outer rim of Curie has been damaged and reshaped by nearby impacts. The sides of the rim are relatively linear, giving the crater an overall box-like shape. The eastern part of the rim is partly overlaid by the notable satellite craters Curie C to the northeast and Curie G along the east. At the northern end the rim is overlaid by the small crater Curie Z. Several other small craters lie along the rim, especially to the southwest.

The interior floor of Curie forms a relatively level plain, at least in comparison to the terrain that surrounds the crater. However this floor is disrupted in several locations by small impacts. A cluster of such impacts lies near the southwestern rim, with several of these craters overlapping each other. The small crater Curie K is located in the southeastern part of the floor, and Curie V lies alongside the northwestern inner wall.

Satellite craters
By convention these features are identified on lunar maps by placing the letter on the side of the crater midpoint that is closest to Curie.

References

 
 
 
 
 
 
 
 
 
 
 
 

Impact craters on the Moon